Kept Husbands is a 1931 American pre-Code drama film directed by Lloyd Bacon, starring Dorothy Mackaill and Joel McCrea, with major supporting roles filled by Robert McWade, Florence Roberts and Mary Carr. The original story was written by the film's associate producer, Louis Sarecky, and adapted for the screen by Forrest Halsey and Alfred Jackson. Although primarily a drama, the film has many comedic touches to it. The film centers around the class struggles and stereotypes between the working class and the wealthy, which was particularly striking during the Depression era when this film was made.  The film also points out the stereotypical gender roles which were prevalent at that time.

Plot summary

Arthur Parker (Robert McWade) is a wealthy steel magnate who is relating the story to his snobbish wife and spoiled daughter of one of his plant supervisors who fearlessly rushed in and saved the lives of two of his fellow co-workers. When his wife, Henrietta (Florence Roberts), asks if he rewarded the young man, Parker shows his astonishment by saying that the hero had refused the thousand dollars he had offered. When the daughter, Dot (Dorothy Mackaill), remarks that she would like to meet a man like that, the father tells her not to worry, she will, for he is coming to dinner that very evening. Henrietta is aghast at having to socialize with someone not of their class, but Parker, who is a better judge of character, assures her that all will be well.

During dinner, Dot is smitten with the young man, Dick Brunton (Joel McCrea).  She makes a bet with her father that she can get him to marry her within four weeks.  The father takes that bet, and lo and behold she wins Dick's heart and gets him to accept her proposal of marriage by the deadline, despite his fears of their different social circumstances.

After the wedding, Parker sends the newlyweds on an expensive honeymoon to Europe, after which they return to their lavish home, also supplied by Parker. Parker also promotes Dick, but within six months, his new lifestyle threatens to emasculate Dick, who loses interest in his career and finds himself dominated by Dot's vapid, social whirl of bridge games, cocktail parties and passive acceptance of life as a "kept husband". This does not sit well with the proud husband, and when Parker offers him a chance to prove himself with a new position in St. Louis, he jumps at the chance. When told of the opportunity however, Dot is less than enthusiastic, not wanting to leave her friends and social circle. She refuses to agree to accompany Dick.

Dick decides to go to St. Louis, with or without Dot, making her incredibly upset. Not knowing what to do, he goes to ask advice from his mother (Mary Carr), who tells him that he needs to reconcile with Dot before he leaves for St. Louis. Meanwhile, Dot has agreed to meet with a former beau, Charles Bates (Bryant Washburn), who attempts to seduce her.  When she returns to their house the following morning, Dick questions her regarding her whereabouts. She lies to him, and he knows it, since he had seen her with Washburn the prior evening. Furious, he storms out, saying their marriage is over, and intending to resign from Parker's company.

Realizing her love for him, Dot eventually finds Dick at the rail station, about to leave for St. Louis. He has decided to take Parker's position after all. The husband and wife reconcile, with Dot agreeing to live within the means that Dick's salary can provide.

Cast

Dorothy Mackaill as Dorothea "Dot" Parker Brunton
Joel McCrea as Richard "Dick" Brunton
Ned Sparks as Hughie Hanready
Mary Carr as Mrs. Brunton
Clara Kimball Young as Mrs. Henrietta Post
Robert McWade as Arthur Parker
Bryant Washburn as Charlie Bates
Florence Roberts as Mrs. Henrietta Parker
Freeman Wood as Mr. Post
Lita Chevret as Gwen

(Cast list as per AFI database)

Soundtrack 
 "The Wedding March", written by Felix Mendelssohn-Bartholdy
 "Three Little Words", written by Bert Kalmar and Harry Ruby - whistled by Joel McCrea

Notes 

In 1959, the film entered the public domain in the United States because the claimants did not renew its copyright registration in the 28th year after publication.

The tag line for the film was "Every Inch a Man - Bought Body and Soul by His Wife".

This film marked the debut in sound films of Clara Kimball Young, who had been a major star during the silent film era.  She came back after a six-year hiatus from making films.

References

External links 

1931 films
1930s English-language films
American black-and-white films
1931 drama films
RKO Pictures films
Films scored by Max Steiner
Films set in St. Louis
Films set in Monaco
Films set in Paris
Films directed by Lloyd Bacon
American drama films
1930s American films